is a Japanese football player currently playing for Tochigi SC.

Club statistics
Updated to end of 2018 season.

1Includes FIFA Club World Cup and Promotion Playoffs to J1.

National Team Career
Last update: 29 January 2010

Appearances in major competitions

References

External links

Profile at Renofa Yamaguchi

1991 births
Living people
Association football people from Toyama Prefecture
Japanese footballers
J1 League players
J2 League players
Sanfrecce Hiroshima players
Tokushima Vortis players
Renofa Yamaguchi FC players
Tochigi SC players
Association football midfielders